Aleksey Ivanovich Buldakov PAR (26 March 1951 – 3 April 2019) was a Soviet and Russian movie actor.

Selected filmography
 Through the Fire (1982) as Savely
Confrontation (1985) as director of taxi company
 Moonzund (1987) as Portnyagin
 All Costs Paid (1988) as Khramov
 The Guard (1990) as Paromov
 Mother (1990) as Stepan Somov
 Shirli-Myrli (1995) as commander of the An-124 crew
 Za co? (1995) as captain
 I, a Russian soldier (1995) as sergeant
 Peculiarities of the National Hunt (1995) as  General Ivolgin
 Hello, Fools! (1996) as foreman from Ukraine
 Operation Happy New Year (1996) as  General Ivolgin 
 Peculiarities of the National Fishing (1998) as  General Ivolgin 
 Peculiarities of the National Hunt in Winter Season (2000) as  General Ivolgin 
 Peculiarities of National Politics (2003) as  General Ivolgin 
 The Tulse Luper Suitcases: From Sark to the Finish (2003) as Colonel Kotchef
 Hitler Goes Kaput! (2008) as Kuzmich
 Burnt by the Sun 2 (2010) as Semyon Budyonny

References

External links

 

1951 births
2019 deaths
Deaths from thrombosis
People from Klyuchevsky District
Soviet male film actors
Soviet male television actors
Russian male film actors
Russian male television actors
Russian male stage actors
20th-century Russian male actors
21st-century Russian male actors
Honored Artists of the RSFSR
People's Artists of Russia
Recipients of the Nika Award